Robert Mercier (14 October 1909 – 23 September 1958) was a French footballer who played as a forward for Club Français, RC Paris and RC Arras. Alongside Walter Kaiser, he was Ligue 1 first top goalscorer with 15 goals in 1932–33. After his playing career, he became a coach with FC Dieppe.

External links and references

 Profile at FFF

1909 births
1958 deaths
French footballers
Association football forwards
France international footballers
Ligue 1 players
Racing Club de France Football players
Club Français players
French football managers